Ntreev Soft is a South Korean video game development studio primarily known for the development of the online multiplayer golf game PangYa as well as the anime-styled MMORPG, Trickster Online.

The company first split off from the South Korean game developer  in late 2003, and had the majority of its shares bought by iHQ in 2005. Those shares were transferred to the holding company of SK Telecom after they purchased the majority shares of iHQ in 2007, making SK Group the Parent company of Ntreev Soft until 2012.

Ntreev Soft initially used to host the North American version of the MMORPG Grand Chase before transferring the rights to KOG's North American branch KOG Games, then known as Kill3rCombo, in 2010.

On 8 July 2011, NCSoft Corporation started a contract with SK Telecom to acquire Ntreev Soft Co., Ltd. from SK Group because NCSoft has never succeeded in launching casual online games.
On 15 February 2012. NCSoft acquired Ntreev Soft from its parent company, SK Telecom.

References

External links

Video game companies of South Korea
Companies based in Gyeonggi Province
NCSoft
South Korean companies established in 2003
Video game companies established in 2003
Video game development companies